was a Japanese actor. He appeared in more than 90 films between 1952 and 1996.

Selected filmography

Film
 Gendai-jin (1952)
 Mahiru no ankoku (1956)
 An Actress (1956)
 Underworld Beauty (1958)
 Arashi no naka o tsuppashire (1958)
 My Second Brother (1959)
 Everything Goes Wrong (1960)
 Kurenai no Kenju (1961) - Kokuta
 Red Angel (1966) - Doctor Okabe
 Red Handkerchief (1964)
 Woman of the Lake (1966)
 Shōsetsu Yoshida gakkō (1983) - Ichirō Hatoyama
 Death of a Tea Master (1989) - Toyotomi Hideyoshi
 Shaso (1989)
 Childhood Days (1990)
 Ruten no umi (1990)

Television
 Akō Rōshi (1964) 
 Shin Heike Monogatari (1972) - Minamoto no Yorimasa
 Genroku Taiheiki (1975) - Tokugawa Tsunayoshi
 Musashibō Benkei (1986) - Taira no Kiyomori
 Nobunaga: King of Zipangu (1992) - Saitō Dōsan

References

External links

1914 births
1999 deaths
Japanese male film actors
People from Shimane Prefecture
20th-century Japanese male actors